Sir Kenneth John Wilson Alexander  (14 March 1922 – 27 March 2001) was a Scottish economist and university administrator. He also had strong links to the Scottish steel and shipbuilding industries.

Life
He was born in Edinburgh, the son of William Wilson Alexander. He won a scholarship to George Heriot's School and then, after service in the RAF in the Second World War, studied at the Bonar College of Economics in Dundee (part of University College, Dundee) graduating with first class honours in 1949. He did postgraduate research at Leeds University 1949 to 1951 then lectured at Sheffield University until 1956 when he moved to lecture at Aberdeen University.

In 1963 Alexander was created the first Professor of Economics at Strathclyde University (1963–80). In 1964 he was invited to deliver the inaugural Marlow (Scotland) Lecture to the Institution of Engineers and Shipbuilders in Scotland. He chose the subject 'Casual Labour and Labour Casualties'. Alexander was invited by the Labour government to chair a review of the future of adult education in Scotland. This report was published in 1975 under the title Adult Education: The Challenge of Change. Its main recommendation was to create a wider community education approach by linking adult education more closely with youth and community work, in order to be able to engage more people in lifelong learning. This led to the creation of local authority community education services.

In the 1960s he was brought in to resolve and rescue several Glasgow shipyards. He was Director of Upper Clyde Shipbuilders, Chairman of Govan Shipbuilders and Director of Fairfield Shipbuilding and Engineering Company. This ceased the restrictive practices introduced by the unions in exchange for guaranteed employment. He was also at the forefront of the economic reasoning to save Ravenscraig steelworks.

In 1976 he succeeded Sir Robert Grieve as Chairman of the Highlands & Islands Development Board (1976–1980). He was also a Director of Scottish Television and the Stakis Organisation. He was Chairman of the Committee on Adult Education in Scotland and in this role wrote the Alexander Report (1976). He was Chairman of the Edinburgh Book Festival from 1987 to 1991.

He left Strathclyde to serve as the Principal of Stirling University (1981–86), and the Chancellor of Aberdeen University (1986–96). Alexander was Vice-president of the Royal Society of Edinburgh (1993–96).

Alexander received an Honorary Doctorate from Heriot-Watt University in September 1995.

At Aberdeen he was responsible for creation of the Elphinstone Institute: promoting the study of culture in north-east Scotland.

He died following a long illness on 27 March 2001.

Family

He married Angela May Lane in 1949. They had one son and four daughters.

Publications

Economics in Business (1967)

References

1922 births
2001 deaths
Scottish knights
Fellows of the Royal Society of Edinburgh
Knights Bachelor
Academics from Edinburgh
People educated at George Heriot's School
Alumni of the University of Dundee
Academics of the University of Strathclyde
Chancellors of the University of Aberdeen
Scottish civil servants
Scottish economists
Royal Air Force personnel of World War II
Presidents of the Saltire Society